The Republic of Vietnam National Police Field Force (Vietnamese: Cảnh Sát Dã Chiến – CSDC), also designated Police de Campagne by the French and variously as National Police Field Force (NPFF), Field Police or Field Force for short by the Americans, was a paramilitary élite branch of the Republic of Vietnam National Police (Vietnamese: Cảnh Sát Quốc Gia – CSQG).  Active during the Vietnam War, the CSDC operated closely with the Army of the Republic of Vietnam (ARVN) and the American Central Intelligence Agency (CIA) from 1966 to 1975.

Origins
The CSDC was created in January 1966 by the South Vietnamese government as an armed support unit for the National Police.

Role
The missions performed by the CSDC went well beyond the normal duties of a civil police force, functionally serving as another branch of the South Vietnamese armed forces, being organized and trained for paramilitary operations in the field on both rural and urban areas. Primarily assigned to anti-guerrilla warfare, counterinsurgency, humint duties. CSDC companies and battalions were also employed in various other tasks such as guarding important public buildings, VIP protection, public security, counterintelligence, riot control, cordon and search, jungle, mountain and urban combat operations. Between 1967 and 1972 the CSDC was deeply involved in the highly controversial CIA-run Phoenix Program, participating actively in the "neutralization" – which often involved arbitrary arrests without charge, routine torture, and extrajudicial executions – of suspected members of the civil infrastructure or "shadow administration" of the Viet Cong (VC).

Composition
CSDC members' were usually National Policemen that volunteered to Field Force service, although the unit also accepted military personnel either transferred or retired from the Army of the Republic of Vietnam (ARVN). The latter included former members of the Army of the Republic of Vietnam Special Forces (Vietnamese: Lực Lượng Đặc Biệt Quân Lực Việt Nam Cộng Hòa – LLDB) following its disbandment in December 1970.

Structure and organization
The Field Police Command Staff reported directly for operational orders to the National Police Command and was co-located to the CSQG Headquarters at Saigon. Under the designation of 'Armed Support Unit' (Vietnamese: Đơn vị hỗ trợ vũ trang), by 1969 the CSDC Command was in charge of the Field Police units and of the River and Coastal Police. Rechristened 'Reaction Unit' (Vietnamese: Đơn vị phản ứng) in 1972, the Field Police Command integrated the Provincial Investigation Force (Vietnamese: Lực lượng điều tra tỉnh) and in 1973 changed again its designation to 'Mobile Operations Department' (Vietnamese: Phòng điều hành di động).

The basic unit of the Field Police was the company (Vietnamese: Dai Đội – DD), organized into a 24-man company headquarters (HQ) and several 40-man combat platoons (Vietnamese: Trung Đội – TRD), each with four 10-man squads (Vietnamese: Tiệu Đội). Until 1968, one company was assigned to each province and main cities and fielded a number of platoons ranging from two to 13 according to the number of rural or urban districts. For example, up to five districts a single company was assigned, but if a province or town counted more than six districts, two companies could be deployed.  After 1969, a major re-organization was implemented, with the provincial companies being expanded to battalions (Vietnamese: Tiệu Doàn – TD).  By August 1971, the CSDC strength totaled 16,500 officers and enlisted men organized into 44 provincial battalions comprising some 90 companies, 242 district platoons and one independent armoured cavalry platoon. Two independent companies of four platoons each were based respectively at Vũng Tàu and Da Nang, two autonomous port cities which had their own municipal police services separated from the province in which they were located.

To provide supervision and support to all these provincial and urban Field Police units, Regional Headquarters and Service Companies were located at each of the country's four Military Regions. A CSDC company was usually commanded by an Inspector (a Captain after 1971), who came under the operational command of the National Police provincial chief (Vietnamese: Trưởng công an tỉnh) whilst platoons assigned to the districts were firmly under operational control of the district police chief (Vietnamese: Trưởng công an huyện) who, in turn, was directly answerable to the district political chief (Vietnamese: Trưởng phòng chính trị huyện).

Armoured car unit
A predominantly light infantry force, the CSDC operated a single independent armoured cavalry platoon (Vietnamese: Trung đội kỵ binh độc lập), provided with eight World War II-vintage US M8 Greyhound light armoured cars. Headquartered at Saigon, it was tasked of providing security to the National Police HQ and the adjoining National Bank building and their environs. This unit specialize in combat and patrolling in jungle area, combat and patrolling in urban areas, and maneuver warfare.

Tactical Mobile Groups
In addition, the Field Police maintained two Tactical Mobile Groups – TMG (Vietnamese: Biêt Doàn – BD) totalling 5,000 men and designated BD 5 and BD 222 respectively, which conferred the National Police the capacity to engage independently in either defensive or offensive actions according to its mission of operational defense.

Based at Saigon, BD 5 was in fact an enlarged battalion since it fielded, in addition to one headquarters' (HQ) company, 12 to 14 combat companies of four platoons each. The battalion operated on the wider Saigon-Gia Định region, assigned to the Saigon Municipal Police Directorate (Vietnamese: Tổng cục cảnh sát thành phố Sài Gòn) which was encharged with the internal security and internal defense of the capital. During the Tet Offensive in January 1968 the unit was committed in the defense of President Nguyễn Văn Thiệu's residence, the Independence Palace alongside other National Police and ARVN units, distinguishing itself at the battles for the Tan Son Nhut Air Base, Cholon, the Phu Tho Racetrack and the Cha Tam Church, where they inflicted heavy losses on attacking VC units.

Also headquartered at Saigon, BD 222, a smaller battalion with just six combat companies, was in turn assigned to the General Reserve (Vietnamese: Tổng dự trữ) of the National Police as a quick reaction unit that could be deployed nationwide, being tasked with specific missions and reinforcement duties. Engaged in Saigon during the Tet in 1968, the field policemen of BD 222 succeeded in flushing out the VC "Sappers" (Vietnamese: Đắc Cộng) entrenched in the National Radio Broadcasting Station building, located a few hundred meters away from the American Embassy, but also fought elsewhere. Between 1968 and 1975, the Battalion's combat companies were deployed at various times and locations throughout the country, engaging in defensive and offensive operations in conjunction with other National Police or ARVN units at Huế, Da Nang, Bình Định, Tuyên Duế, Gia Định, Long An, Biên Hòa, and Phú Quốc Island. When the city of An Lộc was besieged in April 1972 during the Easter Offensive by three People's Army of Vietnam (PAVN) armoured divisions, BD 222 was rushed in to bolster the city's defenses and successfully held its ground against repeated assaults by enemy tanks.

Police Special Recon Teams
Reconnaissance and scouting missions were performed by the combat trackers of the Special Recon Teams – SRT (Vietnamese: Trịnh Sát Đắc Biêt – TSDB).  Recruited from ethnic minorities such as the Khmer Krom, Cham, Nùng or the Degar hill tribes (a.k.a. Montagnards in French), they were organized into platoon-sized units attached to each CSDC company. They specialize in abseiling, counter-ambushes, exfil by airmobile, fast tactical shooting, forward observer, hand and arm signals, hand-to-hand combat, infiltrate the area with a helicopter, jungle and mountain warfare, living off the jungle and mountain, long-range penetration, reconnaissance combat tactics, small unit combat tactics, tactical emergency medical, tactical radio communications, tracking tactics, unconventional combat tactics, and use a map and compass.

Training
National Policemen who volunteered to Field Force service, in addition to their basic police instruction, also received advanced paramilitary training. Probatier officers recently graduated by the Hoc Viên Police Academy or the Da Lat Military Academy had to undergo a complete instruction cycle on combat tactics at the ARVN Infantry School for officers in Thủ Đức, Saigon, whilst patrolmen who had completed their basic training at Rach Dua also attended a similar program at the ARVN Combat Training Centre and NCO School co-located at Da Lat. At this stage, all combat training was carried out at squad- and platoon-level, which enabled the recruits to attain a good tactical manoeuver capacity in the field. 

Following this, the would-be Field Policemen – including officers and NCOs – underwent further eight weeks' of training in CSDC paramilitary skills at the National Police Training Centres of Mã Lai Á and Phi Luât Tân. Instruction covered subjects such as close protection, combat and patrolling techniques in urban areas, counter-ambushes, crowd control, exfil, first aid, hand and arm signals, hand-to-hand combat, infiltrate the area with a helicopter, intelligence collection, intelligence gathering operations, jungle and mountain combat tactics, law enforcement, living off the jungle, radio communications, raid and reconnaissance combat tactics, riot control techniques, tracking tactics, and use a map and compass. To upgrade their capabilities, squads and platoons were returned periodically to these training centres for six weeks of unit refresher training, but for most CSDC companies and battalions posted in the provinces their refresher course actually took place at the regional training centres.  Additional military "on the job" training was provided to Field Police units in the field by U.S. Mobile Training Teams or by Australian advisors from the Australian Army Training Team Vietnam (AATTV). 

Selected officer students were also sent to the Royal Malaysian Police Field Force Special Training Centre at Kentonmen, Ulu Kinta, Perak in Malaysia to attend advanced specialized police and instructor's courses; after graduation, some of these new National Police officers upon returning to South Vietnam would them be posted as Field Police instructors at the Police training centres to pass on their skills to CSDC recruits.

Weapons and equipment
The CSDC was lightly armed by military standards, but heavily armed by conventional police standards. Initially, most of its weaponry was surplus World War II/Korean War-vintage – the standard issue weapon was the heavy M1 Garand semi-automatic rifle, complemented by M1/M2 carbines, M3 and Thompson submachine guns and BAR light machine guns. From 1969, rifles, carbines and submachine guns began to be replaced by the M16 Rifle and although the latter became the CSDC's primary weapon, it never displaced entirely the earlier weaponry. In addition, each platoon had an M79 Grenade Launcher and a .30 caliber medium machine-gun. Twenty-four shotguns were available in the company weapons pool. The Field Police had no crew-served weapon systems such as mortars or any other indirect fire weapons.

M1917 revolver
Smith & Wesson Model 10 Revolver
Smith & Wesson SW2 Bodyguard .38 Special snub-nose revolver
Colt Cobra .38 Special snub-nose revolver
Smith & Wesson Model 39 Pistol
Colt.45 M1911A1 Automatic pistol 
M1 Garand Battle rifle
M1 Carbine
M2 Carbine
M3 and M3A1 "Grease Gun" submachine guns
IMI Uzi submachine gun
M1A1 Thompson submachine gun
M16A1 Assault rifle 
Ithaca Model 37 Pump-action shotgun 
Stevens Model 77E Pump-action shotgun
M1918A2 BAR Light machine gun
M60 Machine Gun
Browning M1919A4 .30 Cal Medium machine gun
M79 Grenade Launcher

Vehicles
Willys MB Jeep
Willys M38 MC Jeep
Dodge M37 utility truck
Kaiser Jeep M715 utility truck
M8 Greyhound Light armoured car

Uniforms and insignia
Field Police personnel were initially given the same standard ARVN olive green fatigues as the other National Police branches, but from 1967 they began to receive a new 'Leopard' camouflage fatigues, dubbed the 'earth-colour flower' (Vietnamese: Hoa Mâu Dât) uniform by the Vietnamese.  This was a locally produced copy of the American-designed Mitchell 'Clouds' camouflage pattern, which incorporated overlapping dark brown, russet, beige, light brown and ochre cloud-shaped blotches on a tan background.

Olive green US M-1951 field jackets or locally made copies in camouflage cloth were issued to Field Police companies operating in the chilly mountain environment of the Central Highlands.

Headgear
Field Police troopers were distinguished from the rest of the National Police by a black beret made of a single piece of wool attached to a black leather rim-band provided with two tightening-straps at the back. Berets were often carefully molded to achieve a pointed shape or 'Cockscomb crest', affected by so many South Vietnamese military personnel since it reportedly gave the wearer a more imposing figure and aggressive 'Shock trooper' or 'Commando' allure.  It was worn French-style pulled to the left, with the National Police cap badge placed above the right eye.
Originally intended to be worn with the regulation National Police dress uniform in formal occasions, the beret was sometimes seen in the field but it was often replaced by camouflage jungle hats and US M-1 model 1964 steel helmets, the latter worn with a matching 'Clouds' camouflage cover.  A US M-1 Helmet liner painted in shiny black, marked with white-and-red stripes at the sides and the initials "TC" (Vietnamese: Tuấn Chân – patrol) was worn by Field Police troopers assigned patrol duties or riot control in urban areas.

Footwear
Black leather combat boots were provided by the Americans who issued both the early US Army M-1962 'McNamara' model and the M-1967 model with 'ripple' pattern rubber sole, standard issue in the ARVN.  In the field, field policemen generally wore the highly prized US Army Jungle boot and black or green canvas Vietnamese-produced Bata tropical boots, replaced by leather or commercial plastic and rubber sandals while in garrison. Some individuals had zippers put into the insides of their Jungle boots so that they could be laced permanently in a fancy 'airborne' pattern, while the wearer could get into and out of his boots quickly and easily by using the zipper.

Insignia
Regarding the placement of insignia, the CSDC had a system of its own, originally adapted from their dress uniform. Most CSDC troopers wore no insignia on their field camouflage uniforms while on operations, or sometimes just their Company patch in either cloth or metal versions in a pocket hanger following the French model suspended from the right shirt pocket.

Special Recon Teams were issued a round embroidered black patch edged red, with red "CSQG" and "TSDB" lettering and winged sword-bayonet pointed down.

See also
 Army of the Republic of Vietnam (ARVN)
 Army of the Republic of Vietnam Special Forces (LLDB)
 Central Intelligence Agency (CIA)
 Civilian Irregular Defense Groups (CIDG)
 Directorate of National Coordination (Laos)
 General Operations Force (Malaysia)
 Phoenix Program
 Provincial Reconnaissance Units (PRUs)
 Republic of Vietnam Military Forces
 Royal Lao Police
 Royal Thai Police Aerial Resupply Unit (PARU)
 Royal Malaysian Police
 Vietnam War
 Weapons of the Vietnam War
 Weapons of the Laotian Civil War

Endnotes

References

 Gordon L. Rottman and Ramiro Bujeiro, Army of the Republic of Vietnam 1955–75, Men-at-arms series 458, Osprey Publishing Ltd, Oxford 2010. 
 Kenneth Conboy and Simon McCouaig, South-East Asian Special Forces, Elite series 33, Osprey Publishing Ltd, London 1991. 
 Kevin Lyles, Vietnam ANZACs – Australian & New Zealand Troops in Vietnam 1962–72, Elite series 103, Osprey Publishing Ltd, Oxford 2004. 
 James Arnold, Tet Offensive 1968 – Turning point in Vietnam, Campaign series 4, Osprey Publishing Ltd, London 1990. 
 Lee E. Russell and Mike Chappell, Armies of the Vietnam War 2, Men-at-arms series 143, Osprey Publishing Ltd, London 1983. 
 Leroy Thompson, US Combat Shotguns, Weapon series 29, Osprey Publishing Ltd, Oxford 2013. 
 Michael H. Kluever, Weapons Backdate – Trench Guns, in Command magazine – Military History, Strategy & Analysis, Issue 36, March 1996, pp. 12–13.
 Nigel de Lee, Chapter 2 – Southeast Asia: the impact of Mao Tse-tung (pp. 48–61) in John Pimlott (ed.), Guerrilla Warfare, Bison Books Ltd., London 1985. 
 Phillip Katcher and Mike Chappell, Armies of the Vietnam War 1962–1975, Men-at-arms series 104, Osprey Publishing Ltd, London 1980. 
 Sir Robert Thompson et al., Report on the Republic of Vietnam National Police, 1971.
 Valéry Tarrius, La Police de Campagne du Sud-Vietnam 1967–1975, in Armes Militaria Magazine, March 2005 issue, Histoire & Collections, Paris, pp. 37–43.  (in French)
 Data on GVN Field Force/Police – January 1, 1968, Folder 01, Box 16, Douglas Pike Collection: Unit 06 – Democratic Republic of Vietnam, The Vietnam Center and Archive, Texas Tech University

Further reading

 Leroy Thompson, Michael Chappell, Malcolm McGregor and Ken MacSwan, Uniforms of the Indo-China and Vietnam Wars, Blandford Press, London 1984. ASIN: B001VO7QSI
 Martin Windrow and Mike Chappell, The French Indochina War 1946–54, Men-at-arms series 322, Osprey Publishing Ltd, Oxford 1998.

External links
Federation of South Vietnam Police Associations (in Vietnamese)
The "White Mice" of Vietnam 
RVN National Police at globalsecurity.org
 http://www.polinsignia.com/vietnam.htm

Republic of Vietnam National Police
National Central Bureaus of Interpol
Military units and formations disestablished in the 1970s
1975 disestablishments in Vietnam